"If You Love Somebody Set Them Free" is the first single released from Sting's solo debut album The Dream of the Blue Turtles. It is also the opening track of the album, and is featured on Fields of Gold: The Best of Sting 1984–1994 as well as The Very Best of Sting & The Police.

Song information
Like much of the album, the song has heavy jazz influences, and was a major hit, peaking at number one on the US Album Rock Tracks chart for three weeks. On the US pop chart, it peaked at number three on the US Billboard Hot 100, number 17 on the US R&B chart, number 26 on the UK Singles Chart, and number 18 on the Australian Kent Music Report singles chart.

A demo version of this song was recorded with Phil Collins as session musician.

Live performances of the song are featured on the DVD edition of Bring On the Night and on the CD and DVD editions of ...All This Time.

A portion of the song was later used for Sting's 1987 hit "We'll Be Together" from ...Nothing Like the Sun.

The single launched a long string of singles (stretching over three albums) where Sting collaborated with New Orleans saxophonist and one-time Tonight Show bandleader Branford Marsalis.

The song was also performed at The Brits in February 1995 with M People. He duetted on the song with the band's lead singer, Heather Small and this track was given the dance treatment by the band who were also backed by a 100-strong Gospel Choir at the Earls Court Arena during the annual music awards show.

Sting said that he wrote the song as an "antidote" to the Police's 1983 song, "Every Breath You Take", which he also wrote. The song was also lampooned by The Dead Milkmen in the song "If You Love Somebody, Set Them on Fire", from their 1990 album Metaphysical Graffiti.

In 2019, Sting rerecorded a new Dance-centric version of the single, one of six songs produced by Dave Aude for Sting's My Songs set, which was remixed by Tom Stephan, among others.

Reception
Cash Box called the song "a satisfying jazz/R&B/R&R exercise" with "sophisticated production and poignant lyric."

Single release
The single B-side consists of a studio recording of the song "Another Day" which would appear the following year in a live version on Sting's live album Bring On the Night.

The US and France 12" singles also contains two remixes of "If You Love Somebody Set Them Free": the "Jellybean Mix" by John 'Jellybean' Benitez and the "Torch Mix" by William Orbit of Torch Song.

Music video
The music video was directed by Godley and Creme in 1985.  It was shot in Paris on a soundstage, with each of the musicians performing separately and the footage then overlaid onto the final version.

Track listings
7" US and Canada single (AM-2738)
 "If You Love Somebody Set Them Free" – 4:14
 "Another Day" – 3:59

12" US single (SP-12132)
 "If You Love Somebody Set Them Free" (Extended Remix by John "Jellybean" Benitez) – 8:00
 "If You Love Somebody Set Them Free" – 4:14
 "If You Love Somebody Set Them Free" (Torch Song Mix, Produced by William Orbit) – 4:52
 "Another Day" – 3:59

12" US promotional single (SP-17324)
 "If You Love Somebody Set Them Free" – 4:14
 "If You Love Somebody Set Them Free" – 4:14

12" France single (392 018-1)
 "If You Love Somebody Set Them Free" (Torch Song Mix, Produced by William Orbit) – 4:52
 "If You Love Somebody Set Them Free" (Remix by John "Jellybean" Benitez) – 8:00
 "If You Love Somebody Set Them Free" – 4:14
 "Another Day" – 3:59

Charts

Year-end charts

Certifications

References

Sting (musician) songs
1985 debut singles
Songs written by Sting (musician)
Music videos directed by Godley and Creme
A&M Records singles
1985 songs